4-Dimethylaminopyridine (DMAP) is a derivative of pyridine with the chemical formula (CH3)2NC5H4N.  This white solid is of interest because it is more basic than pyridine, owing to the resonance stabilisation from the NMe2 substituent.

Because of its basicity, DMAP is a useful nucleophilic catalyst for a variety of reactions such as esterifications with anhydrides, the Baylis-Hillman reaction, hydrosilylations, tritylation, the Steglich rearrangement, Staudinger synthesis of β-lactams and many more. Chiral DMAP analogues are used in kinetic resolution experiments of mainly secondary alcohols and Evans auxiliary type amides.

Preparation
DMAP can be prepared in a two-step procedure from pyridine, which is first oxidized to 4-pyridylpyridinium cation.  This cation then reacts with dimethylamine:

Esterification catalyst

In the case of esterification with acetic anhydrides the currently accepted mechanism involves three steps. First, DMAP and acetic anhydride react in a pre-equilibrium reaction to form an ion pair of acetate and the acetylpyridinium ion. In the second step the alcohol adds to the acetylpyridinium, and elimination of pyridine forms an ester. Here the acetate acts as a base to remove the proton from the alcohol as it nucleophilically adds to the activated acylpyridinium. The bond from the acetyl group to the catalyst gets cleaved to generate the catalyst and the ester. The described bond formation and breaking process runs synchronous concerted without the appearance of a tetrahedral intermediate. The acetic acid formed will then protonate the DMAP. In the last step of the catalytic cycle the auxiliary base (usually triethylamine or pyridine) deprotonates the protonated DMAP, reforming the catalyst. The reaction runs through the described nucleophilic reaction pathway irrespective of the anhydride used, but the mechanism changes with the pKa value of the alcohol used. For example, the reaction runs through a base-catalyzed reaction pathway in the case of a phenol. In this case, DMAP acts as a base and deprotonates the phenol, and the resulting phenolate ion adds to the anhydride.

Safety
DMAP has a relatively high toxicity and is particularly dangerous because of its ability to be absorbed through the skin. It is also corrosive.

Related compound
4-Pyrrolidinylpyridine

References

Further reading 
 
 

Reagents for organic chemistry
Aminopyridines
Catalysts
Dimethylamino compounds